The Nasserist Socialist Vanguard Party is a Nasserist political party in Iraq. It is led by Mowaffaq al-Ani.

See also
Arab Socialist Union (Iraq)
Arab Struggle Party

References

Arab nationalism in Iraq
Nasserist political parties
Nationalist parties in Iraq
Socialist parties in Iraq